State Road 66 is an east–west highway in six counties in the southernmost portion of the U.S. state of Indiana.

Route description
State Road 66 begins at the eastern end of a toll bridge over the Wabash River in New Harmony and ends at U.S. Route 150 east of Hardinsburg. It is a divided limited-access highway in the metropolitan Evansville area, where it is part of the Lloyd Expressway, and also between the unincorporated communities of Yankeetown and Hatfield. For the most part, however, State Road 66 is undivided rural highway following the Ohio River, and a large portion of its route (from just east of Newburgh to State Road 62 at Sulphur) carries the designation of the Ohio River Scenic Byway.

History

Lloyd Expressway

Within the City of Evansville, the portion of SR 66 east of US 41 is known as the Lloyd Expressway. It is named in honor of former Mayor Russell G. Lloyd, Sr., who was assassinated after leaving office in 1980. In the spring of 1983, buildings in the expressway's path began coming down and construction officially started on July 29, 1983. Motorists endured five years of detours and construction as the expressway was built through the heart of the city.

Major widening
Increasing traffic on the segment of State Road 66 between Evansville and the Alcoa plant east of Newburgh has led the Indiana Department of Transportation to widen the road (eventually being capable of expansion to six lanes) from State Road 261 to the western end of the present Yankeetown-Hatfield four-lane segment.

As of March 2009, work was well underway on the segment from State Road 261 to the Newburgh Lock & Dam.  By the end of 2010, the project was complete from State Road 261 to French Island Trail (formerly Indiana State Road 662), and work was progressing from that point east beyond Indiana State Road 61 to the existing  four-lane stretch near Yankeetown.

Major intersections

References

External links

 Indiana Highway Ends - SR 66

066
Transportation in Orange County, Indiana
Transportation in Crawford County, Indiana
Transportation in Perry County, Indiana
Transportation in Posey County, Indiana
Transportation in Vanderburgh County, Indiana
Transportation in Warrick County, Indiana
Transportation in Washington County, Indiana